Johnny Hernandez is a chef, entrepreneur, and founder and president of Grupo La Gloria and True Flavors Inc.

Life and career 
Johnny Hernandez was born and raised in a community of first-generation Mexican-American families. He attended the Culinary Institute of America in New York.  He began his career at a number of exclusive resort destinations, including the Mirage Hotel & Casino in Las Vegas, Nevada, and the Four Seasons Biltmore in Santa Barbara, California.  Upon returning to San Antonio in 1994, he opened his first venture, True Flavors Catering.

La Gloria, Street Foods of Mexico
Opened in May 2010, La Gloria is situated on the grounds of the historic Pearl Brewery.

Casa Hernán 
The Casa Hernán opened in 2012 in San Antonio. Designed to evoke the grandeur of historic haciendas of Mérida, Mexico, Casa Hernán, plays host to private events and culinary events, such as the chef's Barbacoa brunch, and has been featured in Saveur, Martha Stewart Magazine, and the Emmy-nominated program, Simply Ming.

The Fruteria-Botanero
The Fruteria-Botanero opened in late 2012, in San Antonio's historic Southtown neighborhood.

El Machito
In March 2014, Hernandez opened his third dining concept, El Machito, located in the former Alamo Cement Company building in San Antonio's Quarry Market. El Machito specializes in mesquite grilled meats prepared in the style of the carne asadas of northern Mexico and the campestre style of Guadalajara.  El Machito is permanently closed. 2014 also saw the opening of Hernandez's molino, Tortilleria La Gloria which utilizes traditional, old world methods to produce freshly made corn products for each of his establishments, as well as other San Antonio area restaurants.

Burgerteca
In November 2017, Hernandez opened his fourth dining concept, Burgerteca.

Villa Rica 
Adding to his family of dining and entertaining establishments, Hernandez opened his fifth dining concept, Villa Rica, in February 2018 in partnership with the Guzman family of Veracruz Mexico.

References 

American chefs
American male chefs
Living people
1968 births
Culinary Institute of America Hyde Park alumni
American people of Mexican descent